Amélie Mauresmo defeated Justine Henin-Hardenne in the final, 2–6, 6–3, 6–4 to win the ladies' singles tennis title at the 2006 Wimbledon Championships. It was her second major title, having won the Australian Open earlier in the year. Mauresmo also became the first Frenchwoman to win Wimbledon since Suzanne Lenglen in 1925. Henin-Hardenne was attempting  to complete the career Grand Slam.

Venus Williams was the defending champion, but lost in the third round to Jelena Janković.

With Serena Williams not competing due to a knee injury, this marked the first Wimbledon since 1999 not to feature either of the Williams sisters in the final.

Li Na became the first Chinese player (male or female) to reach a major singles quarterfinal. This also marked the major debut of future world No. 2 Agnieszka Radwańska, who reached the fourth round as a wildcard before losing to Kim Clijsters.

Seeds

  Amélie Mauresmo (champion)
  Kim Clijsters (semifinals)
  Justine Henin-Hardenne (final)
  Maria Sharapova (semifinals)
  Svetlana Kuznetsova (third round)
  Venus Williams  (third round)
  Elena Dementieva (quarterfinals)
  Patty Schnyder (second round)
  Anastasia Myskina (quarterfinals)
  Nicole Vaidišová (fourth round)
  Francesca Schiavone (first round)
  Martina Hingis (third round)
  Anna-Lena Grönefeld (first round)
  Dinara Safina (third round)
  Daniela Hantuchová (fourth round)
  Flavia Pennetta (fourth round)

  Maria Kirilenko (first round)
  Ai Sugiyama (fourth round)
  Ana Ivanovic (fourth round)
  Shahar Pe'er (second round)
  Katarina Srebotnik (third round)
  Nathalie Dechy (first round)
  Anabel Medina Garrigues (third round)
  Marion Bartoli (second round)
  Elena Likhovtseva (third round)
  Jelena Janković (fourth round)
  Li Na (quarterfinals)
  Sofia Arvidsson (first round)
  Tatiana Golovin (second round)
  Anna Chakvetadze (third round)
  Gisela Dulko (third round)
  Mara Santangelo (first round)

Qualifying

Draw

Finals

Top half

Section 1

Section 2

Section 3

Section 4

Bottom half

Section 5

Section 6

Section 7

Section 8

Championship match statistics

References

External links

2006 Wimbledon Championships on WTAtennis.com
2006 Wimbledon Championships – Women's draws and results at the International Tennis Federation

Women's Singles
Wimbledon Championship by year – Women's singles
Wimbledon Championships
Wimbledon Championships